COMSAT Mobile Communications (CMC), a telecommunications company which provides global mobile communications solutions to the maritime, land mobile and aeronautical communities, and offers data, voice, fax, telex and video capabilities via the Inmarsat geosynchronous satellite constellation through two earth station facilities in Southbury, Connecticut, and Santa Paula, California.  CMC was a business unit of COMSAT Corporation of Bethesda, MD (NYSE: CQ) (delisted).

In concert with COMSAT General Corporation's (another business unit of COMSAT Corp) MARISAT system, CMC sparked a revolution in medium- and long-distance maritime ship-to-shore communication, augmenting and eventually replacing cumbersome and technically challenging high-power radiotelegraph and radiotelephone equipment with solid state, user-friendly satellite terminals which required relatively minimal training to use in voice, fax, and telex modes that were impervious to normal radio propagation conditions and unaffected by distance, although initial rates were high ($10 per minute for voice/fax to/from the USA).

History
Acquired by Lockheed Martin Global Telecommunications (LGMT) (a subsidiary of Lockheed Martin) as part of an August 2000 merger with its parent COMSAT Corporation, the COMSAT Mobile Communications unit was purchased from LGMT by Telenor of Norway on 11 January 2002.

See also
 COMSAT Corporation
 INMARSAT
 GMDSS
 Ship Transport: Other departments

Footnotes
Telenor to Acquire COMSAT Mobile Communications From Lockheed Martin Global Telecommunications Lockheed Martin Press Release 27 March 2001. Retrieved 10 January 2010.
 Global Maritime Distress and Safety System (GMDSS) International Maritime Organization. Retrieved 12 January 2010.
 Ross, Irwin. Marisat - deep-space switchboard for ship-shore calls Popular Science, January 1979.  Retrieved 12 January 2010.
Telenor to Acquire COMSAT Mobile Communications From Lockheed Martin Global Telecommunications Lockheed Martin Press Release 27 March 2001. Retrieved 10 January 2010.
Lockheed Martin Reports 2001 Earnings Lockheed Martin Press Release 25 January 2002. Retrieved 10 January 2010.

Telecommunications companies of the United States